The Ivory Tower is the debut album of Californian rock band Takota. The album was released on May 16, 2006 on Ares Records and was produced by Atreyu singer/drummer Brandon Saller.

Track listing
 "The Ivory Tower"
 "Satellite"
 "Lioness"
 "City Drugs" (featuring Brandon Saller)
 "Diary"
 "Turn Up the Radio"
 "Paperheart"
 "Mayday Mayday"
 "Little Honesty"
 "Carpark Conversation"

References

External links
 Interview at Onemetal

2006 debut albums